John Todd or Tod may refer to:

Clergy
John Todd (abolitionist) (1818–1894), preacher and 'conductor' on the Underground Railroad
John Todd (author) (1800–1873), American minister and author
John Todd (bishop), Anglican bishop in the early 17th century
John Baptist Todd (1921–2017), Pakistani Franciscan priest

Mathematics, science, and medicine
John Todd (British biologist) (born 1958), British biologist working on diabetes mellitus
John Todd (Canadian biologist) (born 1939), Canadian biologist working in the field of ecological design
John (Jack) Todd (1911–2007), Northern Irish and American mathematician working in the field of numerical analysis
J. A. Todd (John Arthur Todd, 1908–1994), English mathematician
John Lancelot Todd (1876–1949), Canadian physician and parasitologist
John W. Todd (1912–1989), British physician and author

Politics and government
John Tod (1779–1830), American judge and politician
John Todd (politician), Canadian politician from the Northwest Territories
John Todd (Virginia soldier) (1750–1782), early Virginia official, Kentucky soldier, and great-uncle of Mary Todd Lincoln
John Blair Smith Todd (1814–1872), delegate to US Congress from Dakota Territory
John J. Todd (born 1927), Justice of the Minnesota Supreme Court 
John Rawling Todd (1929–2002), British colonial civil servant

Sports
John Kennedy Tod (1852–1925), Scottish rugby union player
John Todd (footballer) (born 1938), Australian rules football player and coach
John Todd (rugby league), rugby league footballer of the 1910s and 1920s

Other
John Todd (actor) (1876–1957), American actor who played Tonto on the Lone Ranger radio series
John Todd (businessman) (1927–2015), New Zealand businessman
John Todd (conspiracy theorist) (1949–2007), source for fundamentalist Baptist author Jack Chick
John Todd (RAF officer) (1899–1980), British World War I flying ace
John Payne Todd (1792–1852), step-son of U.S. President James Madison

See also
John Tod (1779–1830), member of the U.S. House of Representatives from Pennsylvania
Jack Todd (disambiguation)